Pasta all'Ortolana is an Italian dish made by cooking various different vegetables before mixing them together with pasta ( translates "Greengrocer").

The recipe does not state a specific type of pasta, so it can be made with Fusilli, Fettuccine, Penne, Rigatoni, Farfalle or any other type of short Pasta.
The vegetables used in the process are generally carrots, onions, leeks, garlic, zucchini, celery, yellow and red capsicum, cherry tomatoes and eggplants.

Preparation 

Vegetables have to be washed and cleaned before slicing them in small strips (apart from the celery that needs to be chopped in even smaller pieces). The garlic gets briefly fried with olive oil in a pan until it reaches a golden color, then it gets removed; in the meantime another pan is used to boil some moderately salted water which will be used to cook the pasta.

Carrots, leek and celery get thrown in the pan where the garlic has been fried in olive oil and left cooking for about 6 or 7 minutes, before adding red and yellow capsicum, salt and pepper to the mix. At this point the pasta gets thrown in the other pan with hot boiling water, where it will cook for about 6-10 minutes (varies depending on the type of pasta). After the vegetables have been cooking for another 3 or 4 minutes, 1 or 2 scoops of the hot boiling water (where the pasta is being cooked) need to be poured in the pan with the vegetables, before adding eggplants and cherry tomatoes, leaving everything cooking for about 10 minutes.

When the pasta is almost ready, it gets taken off from the boiling water and thrown into the pan together with all the vegetables, where everything gets tossed and cooked for another 2 or 3 minutes before serving it with few leaves of fresh basil on top.

Variations 

This Italian dish can have many different variation, as the base concept is to create the sauce by using different fresh vegetables, before mixing it with pasta (Just like with the type of pasta, there is no strict specification regarding the type of vegetables used for the Ortolana): some might replace the leek with onion, as well as adding more tomatoes to create a substantial sauce, while other might consider adding black olives to the mix, together with diced smoked cheese.

See also

 List of Italian dishes

References 

Pasta dishes
Italian cuisine
Vegetable dishes